German submarine U-425 was a Type VIIC U-boat of Nazi Germany's Kriegsmarine during World War II.

She carried out nine patrols. She sank no ships.

She was a member of eight wolfpacks.

She was sunk by British warships, near Murmansk on 17 February 1945.

Design
German Type VIIC submarines were preceded by the shorter Type VIIB submarines. U-425 had a displacement of  when at the surface and  while submerged. She had two shafts and two  propellers.

U-425 was fitted with five  torpedo tubes (four fitted at the bow and one at the stern), fourteen torpedoes, one  SK C/35 naval gun, 220 rounds, and two twin  C/30 anti-aircraft guns. The boat had a complement of between forty-four and sixty.

Service history
The submarine was laid down on 23 May 1942 at the Danziger Werft at Danzig (now Gdansk) as yard number 126, launched on 19 December 1942 and commissioned on 21 April 1943 under the command of Kapitänleutnant Heinz Bentzien.

She served with the 8th U-boat Flotilla from 21 April 1943 for training and the 9th flotilla from 1 November for operations. She was reassigned to the 11th flotilla on 1 January 1944, then the 13th flotilla on 15 September of that year.

First patrol
U-425s first patrol began with her departure from Kiel on 20 November 1943. Having cleared the Kattegat and Skagerrak, the boat followed the Norwegian coast to Bergen; arriving there on the 25th.

Second patrol
The submarine criss-crossed the Norwegian and Barents Seas between the North Cape and Bear Island before docking in Hammerfest on 2 February 1944.

Third and fourth patrols
The boat's third and fourth patrols were relatively uneventful; the latter following short trips from Hammerfest to Bergen, to Narvik. The patrol itself was carried out between Jan Mayen and Bear Islands.

Sixth, seventh, eighth and ninth patrols and loss
A regular pattern then emerged between Hammerfest and Narvik. Part of her sixth sortie took U-425 as far north and east as the southern end of Novaya Zemlya in the Pechoskoye More.

The boat was sunk by depth charges dropped by the British sloop  and the corvette  near Murmansk on 17 February 1945.

Wolfpacks
U-425 took part in eight wolfpacks, namely:
 Isegrim (1 – 27 January 1944) 
 Werwolf (29 January – 1 February 1944) 
 Werwolf (7 – 27 February 1944) 
 Trutz (13 May – 6 June 1944) 
 Dachs (31 August – 3 September 1944) 
 Grimm (15 September – 1 October 1944) 
 Panther (17 October – 10 November 1944) 
 Rasmus (6 – 13 February 1945)

References

Bibliography

External links

German Type VIIC submarines
U-boats commissioned in 1943
U-boats sunk in 1945
U-boats sunk by depth charges
U-boats sunk by British warships
1942 ships
Ships built in Danzig
World War II submarines of Germany
World War II shipwrecks in the Arctic Ocean
Maritime incidents in February 1945